The women's doubles was one of five events at the 1921 World Hard Court Championships. Dorothy Holman and Phyllis Satterthwaite were the title holders. Holman paired with Irene Peacock this year, but lost to Germaine Golding and Suzanne Lenglen 6–2, 6–2 in the final.

Draw

Draw

References

Women's Doubles